Granville Henderson Oury (March 12, 1825 – January 11, 1891) was a nineteenth-century American politician, lawyer, judge, soldier, and miner.

Early life
Born in Abingdon, Virginia; Granville Henderson Oury and his family moved to Bowling Green, Missouri, in 1836 where he pursued his academic studies, studied law, and was admitted to the bar in 1848. That year, he moved to San Antonio, Texas, and in 1849 to Marysville, California, where he engaged in mining. He then moved to Tucson, Arizona, in 1856 and began a law practice and was appointed a district judge for New Mexico Territory in Mesilla. Oury was involved in the infamous Crabb Massacre of April 1857, during which no more than 100 Americans were killed after an eight-day battle with Mexican forces at Caborca, Sonora. The Americans were under the command of General Henry A. Crabb, a former California senator, who was allegedly trying to take over Sonora like the filibuster William Walker. Oury was one of the men General Crabb had recruited in Tucson, and he was given the rank of captain and ordered to follow the general into Mexico after recruiting more men. However, when news reached Tucson that a superior force of Mexicans was besieging Crabb's expedition, Major R. N. Wood and Captain Oury were sent across the international border to help their compatriots. Just after crossing the border, the rescue party encountered about 200 Mexicans. A skirmish ensued which forced the Americans back across the border into Arizona. There were no casualties on the Americans' side. Of the Crabb party, all were killed except a fourteen-year-old boy and possibly one other man depending on varying sources.

American Civil War
At the outbreak of the American Civil War in 1861, Oury was elected to the Provisional Congress of the Confederate States representing the Arizona Territory. Around this time, hostile Apaches attacked the town of Tubac, located south of Tucson. Over the course of a few days the Apaches besieged to old Presidio until the settlers were rescued by Oury and a small band of Confederate militia from Tucson. Tubac was destroyed and abandoned but the settlers were saved due to Oury and his men. Oury later resigned his seat in the Confederate Congress to serve as a captain in Herbert's Battalion of Arizona cavalry of the Confederate States Army. He also served as a colonel on the staff of General Henry Hopkins Sibley in Texas and Louisiana from 1862 to 1864. He took the oath of allegiance at Fort Mason in Arizona on October 8, 1865.

Later life and death

After the end of the war, Oury returned to his law practice in Tucson. He was elected to the 3rd Arizona Territorial Legislature in 1866, serving as Speaker of the House that year, and was appointed Arizona Territory Attorney General in 1869. He moved to Phoenix in 1871 and was appointed district attorney for Maricopa County serving from 1871 to 1873. That year his brother, William S. Oury, was involved in the Camp Grant Massacre in which over 140 Apache men, women, and children were killed. Granville was elected in 1873 and 1875 to the 7th and 8th Arizona Territorial Legislature, serving as Speaker during the 1873 session.

Oury unsuccessfully ran as a Democrat for the United States House of Representatives in 1878 and was appointed district attorney for Pinal County in 1879. He was elected a Democrat to the United States House of Representatives in 1880, reelected in 1882, serving from 1881 to 1885, not running for reelection in 1884. He served as a delegate to the 1884 Democratic National Convention in Chicago, returned to Adamsville in 1885, and resumed practicing law. He once again served as district attorney for Pinal County in 1889 and 1890. He died of throat cancer in Tucson on January 11, 1891, and was interred in the Adamsville Cemetery at Adamsville, Arizona.

See also 
 List of United States representatives from Arizona

References

Further reading

 Smith, Cornelius C. Jr. William Sanders Oury, History-Maker of the Southwest. Tucson: University of Arizona Press, 1967.
 David Leighton, "Street Smarts: G. Oury was delegate to Confederacy, US Congress," Arizona Daily Star, July 30, 2013
 David Leighton, "Street Smarts: Adventurous life led Oury here," Arizona Daily Star, July 23, 2013

External links

 
 "Granville Henderson Oury" at The Political Graveyard

|-

1825 births
1891 deaths
19th-century American lawyers
19th-century American politicians
American lawyers admitted to the practice of law by reading law
American miners
Apache Wars
Arizona Attorneys General
Arizona pioneers
Burials in Arizona
Deaths from cancer in Arizona
Cavalry commanders
Confederate States Army officers
Deaths from esophageal cancer
Delegates to the United States House of Representatives from Arizona Territory
Democratic Party members of the United States House of Representatives from Arizona
Deputies and delegates to the Provisional Congress of the Confederate States
District attorneys in Arizona
Lawyers from Tucson, Arizona
Lawyers from Phoenix, Arizona
Members of the Arizona Territorial Legislature
Missouri lawyers
New Mexico lawyers
New Mexico Territory judges
People from Bowling Green, Missouri
People from Marysville, California
Military personnel from San Antonio
People of Arizona in the American Civil War
Politicians from Abingdon, Virginia
Politicians from Phoenix, Arizona
Politicians from Tucson, Arizona
19th-century American judges
Military personnel from California